The Warm Mineral Springs Building Complex consists of three historic buildings built in 1959 in the Warm Mineral Springs park in North Port, Florida. The buildings include a Park Spa Building, a sales building attached to the Spa Building, and a Cyclorama which contained an exhibit depicting Ponce de Leon's alleged discovery of the Fountain of Youth. The three buildings were added to the park facilities to house a Florida Quadricentennial celebration, which ran from December 14, 1959, to March 15, 1960. The Spa Building and the Cyclorama were designed by Jack West, a leader of the Sarasota School of Architecture. The buildings were added to the National Register of Historic Places in 2019.

References

Commercial buildings completed in 1959
Commercial buildings on the National Register of Historic Places in Florida
National Register of Historic Places in Sarasota County, Florida
Modernist architecture in Florida
1959 establishments in Florida